The Stoomtrein Goes - Borsele (Goes-Borsele Steam Train) is a heritage railway operating from Goes through Kwadendamme to the village of Hoedekenskerke, in the province of Zeeland, Netherlands.

Route
The railway's headquarters are located at Goes. From here trains operate to 's-Gravenpolder, Nisse, Kwadendamme, Hoedekenskerke, and finally Baarland. When operating the service using vintage diesel railcars, trains call at all six stations. However, on steam operating days, trains call only at the stations in Goes, Kwadendamme, and Hoedekenskerke. On intensive service days the railway operates both steam trains and diesel railcar trains, but with the same rules about stations.

Locomotives
The railway operates a fleet of seventeen locomotives - nine diesel engines, six steam engines, and two relatively unusual 1,500 volt Alstom  electric engines. Additionally, three heritage diesel railcars are in service.

References

Heritage railways in the Netherlands
Railway lines in Zeeland
Transport in Goes
Borsele